Thijs Timmermans (born 25 July 1998) is a Dutch football player. He currently plays for St Patrick's Athletic in the League of Ireland Premier Division. As well as the Netherlands, he has also played in Poland and Cyprus before moving to Ireland.

Club career
He made his Eerste Divisie debut for FC Dordrecht on 7 September 2018 in a game against Telstar, as a starter.

Following a season in Poland with Odra Opole and two seasons in Cyprus with PAEEK, Timmermans signed for League of Ireland Premier Division club St Patrick's Athletic on 1 July 2022. He made his first appearance in European football on 21 July 2022 in a 1–1 draw with Slovenian side NŠ Mura in the UEFA Europa Conference League. He made his league debut for the club on 19 August 2022, scoring the opening goal in a 2–1 win away to UCD.

Career statistics

Honours
PAEEK
Cypriot Second Division (1): 2020–21

References

External links
 

1998 births
People from Hazerswoude
Living people
Dutch footballers
Dutch expatriate footballers
Association football midfielders
FC Dordrecht players
Odra Opole players
PAEEK players
St Patrick's Athletic F.C. players
Eerste Divisie players
I liga players
League of Ireland players
Dutch expatriate sportspeople in Cyprus
Dutch expatriate sportspeople in Poland
Expatriate footballers in Cyprus
Expatriate footballers in Poland
Expatriate association footballers in the Republic of Ireland
Footballers from South Holland